Nafas may refer to:

Nafas (film)
"Nafas" (song)
Nafas (TV series)
NAFAS, or National Association of Flower Arrangement Societies